The following is a list of people executed by the U.S. state of Texas between 1860 and 1869. During this period a total of 20 people were executed: 16 by hanging and 4 by firing squad.

Executions 1860–1869

See also
 Capital punishment in the United States

References

1860
19th-century executions by Texas
1860s-related lists
1860s in Texas